City Hospital was a medical documentary television series that aired on BBC One from 12 October 1998 until 5 January 2007. It ran over nine series with over 360 hours of film broadcast every weekday from 10 am. It was the successor to The General and initially kept the same location, format and presentation team.

Format
City Hospital was first broadcast live from Southampton University Trust's teaching hospital, Southampton General Hospital but also featured Princess Anne Maternity Hospital. It then moved to London's flagship NHS Health Trust - Guy's Hospital and St Thomas' Hospital in 2002. The show followed real patients and staff and featured daily live-to-air footage of actual surgical operations, as they were being performed. The show's theme tune was an instrumental version of Bruce Hornsby's "The Way It Is". Both The General and City Hospital were produced by Topical Television.

Ratings
A ratings success, the final series commanded a quarter of all the UK television audience at 10am every weekday - over a million viewers daily.

The programme had unprecedented BBC Audience Appreciation (AI) figures for a daytime broadcast. When viewers were asked which programme they would put at the top of all the BBC programmes they had watched that week, City Hospital consistently scored highly. During the last week of programmes, the AI figure was an almost unheard of 88%. The BBC reported: "Alongside the usual big hitters, the dramas and US imports, the daytime programme City Hospital always wins through with high AIs."

Yvette Fielding's live proposal
In 1999 Yvette Fielding's boyfriend, a cameraman on the show, proposed to her live on air. She accepted and the two later married.

Presenters
Presenters included:

 Gaby Roslin
 Matt Baker
 Roger Black
 Yvette Fielding
 Ainsley Harriott
 Matthew Kelly
 Nick Knowles 
 Andi Peters
 Nadia Sawalha
 Sian Williams

Numerous guest presenters, including celebrities, actors and musicians, made cameo appearances.

Transmission guide
Filmed at Southampton General Hospital:
 Series 1: 50 editions from 12 October – 18 December 1998
 Series 2: 28 editions from 12 April – 21 May 1999
 Series 3: 64 editions from 6 September – 17 December 1999
 Series 4: 42 editions from 27 March – 26 May 2000
 Series 5: 51 editions from 4 September – 19 December 2000
 Series 6: 46 editions from 30 April – 6 July 2001

Filmed at Guy's Hospital and St Thomas' Hospital:
 Series 7: 29 editions from 18 February – 28 March 2002
 Series 8: 40 editions from 2 September – 25 October 2002
 Series 9: 39 editions from 6 May – 4 July 2003
 Series 10: 30 editions from 1 September – 10 October 2003
 Series 11: 37 editions from 5 April – 28 May 2004
 Series 12: 40 editions from 6 September – 5 November 2004
 Series 13: 37 editions from 4 April – 27 May 2005
 Series 14: 40 editions from 5 September – 4 November 2005
 Series 15: 37 editions from 3 April – 26 May 2006
 Series 16: 40 editions from 11 September – 10 November 2006
 Winter Health Special: 5 editions from 1 January 2007 – 5 January 2007

References

External links
 

1998 British television series debuts
2007 British television series endings
BBC television documentaries
1990s British documentary television series
2000s British documentary television series
Television shows set in London
Television shows set in Hampshire
1990s British medical television series
2000s British medical television series